The Jungle Nation, also known as the Jungle Republic, was an unrecognised state, that existed between 1899 and 1900, in the modern territory of Peru, within the departaments of Loreto, San Martín, and Ucayali. It was proclaimed on 22 May 1899, by colonel Emilio Vizcarra, who then acquired the title of the Supreme Leader. The state was formed from the territory of Department of Loreto, Peru. It was reincorporated into Peru in 1900, shortly after the death of Vizcarra on 27 February 1900.

History 
In 1896, colonels Eduardo Jessup and Emilio Vizcarra led the land campaign from Cajamarca to intervene in the Loretan Insurrection, fighting against the forces of self-proclaimed Federal State of Loreto. The rebellion was defeated on 10 July 1896, with Federal State being reincorporated into Peru. Following that, Vizcarra was appointed by the Peruvian government, as the prefect of the re-established Department of Loreto. The regional Loretan identity and social chaos were still present among the public, and Vizcarra eventually, started sharing the pro-regional views.

On 22 May 1899, Vizcarra had announced the independence of the Department of Loreto as a sovereign state, called Jungle Nation. He also titled himself the Supreme Leader of said country. The businessman Juan Jiménez Pimentel had financed his political campaign across the state. Eduardo López de Romaña, the president of Peru, in the reaction to the declaration, had ordered colonel Teobaldo Gutiérrez to siege the southern territory of the self-proclaimed state, now located within the Department of San Martín. The reaction of the neighbouring countries of Brazil, Colombia, and Ecuador, was indifferent.

On 27 February 1900, while on a tour across Loretan cities to appoint new authorities, Vizcarra got involved in a civil revolt at the Plaza de Armas square in Moyobamba. The revolt was the response to the abuse carried out by Vizcarra's militias against the local population. During the fighting, the supreme leader was lethally hit with a rock in the head, by a woman with the surname Tapullima. Following his death, the state had fallen a few days later and has been reincorporated into Peru.

See also
 Federal State of Loreto
 Third Federal State of Loreto

Notes

References

Bibliography 
 Frederica Barclay Rey de Castro, El Estado Federal de Loreto, 1896. Centralismo, descentralización y federalismo en el Perú, a fines del siglo XIX. ISBN 978-9972-623-61-5.
 Pilar García Jordán, Núria Sala i Vila, La nacionalización de la Amazonía
Former unrecognized countries
Former countries in South America
History of Peru
Loreto Region
Ucayali Region
San Martín Region
States and territories established in 1899
States and territories disestablished in 1900
1899 establishments in South America
1899 establishments in Peru